The Spiral Staircase is a 1975 British horror mystery thriller film directed by Peter Collinson and starring Jacqueline Bisset and Christopher Plummer. It is a remake of the 1946 film of the same name, which was adapted from Ethel Lina White's 1933 British novel Some Must Watch.

Plot 
Helen Mallory is a beautiful young woman who has been unable to speak a word since seeing her husband and daughter die in a fire. She visits the home of her elderly, invalid grandmother and meets her uncle, Joe Sherman, a respected psychiatrist. The visit turns into a nightmare as she encounters Joe's brash brother Steven, as well as a pretentious Southern belle named Blanche and other mysterious characters in a house where everyone's life seems to be in grave danger.

Cast 
 Jacqueline Bisset as Helen Mallory
 Christopher Plummer as Dr. Joe Sherman
 John Phillip Law as Steven Sherman
 Sam Wanamaker as Lieutenant Fields
 Mildred Dunnock as Mrs. Sherman
 Gayle Hunnicutt as Blanche
 Elaine Stritch as Nurse Baker
 John Ronane as Dr. Rawley
 Sheila Brennan as Mrs. Oates
 Ronald Radd as Oates
 Heather Lowe as Heather
 Christopher Malcolm as Policeman

References

External links
 
 
 
 

1975 films
British thriller films
1970s thriller films
Films directed by Peter Collinson
Films set in country houses
1975 horror films
1970s English-language films
1970s British films